Roman Mikhailovich Kukhar (aliases Volodymyr R., Roman V Kukhar) Кухар Роман Михайлович ( Володимир Р.) (1920–2007) was a Ukrainian poet, writer, He was a professor at Kansas State University. and Fort Hays State University.

Poetry
Володимир Р. Палкі серця.—Лондон, 1964.—211 с.
Кухар Р. До блакитних вершин.—Лондон: Об-ня абсольвентів Укр. Академічної гімназії у Львові, ЗСА, 1981.—146 с.
«Височій, життя!» (1970),
 «Прапори думки» (1970)

Novels
«Прощавай, минуле!» (1977), 
Кухар Р. В. Манівцями. Повість із сучасного побуту в Америці.—Буенос-Айрес: Вид-во Ю. Середяка, 1989.—247 с.
«Поцейбіч борсань» (1996), 
«Тиверська провесінь» (1997); 
Володимир Р. Андрій Первозваний. Історична повість.—К.: Україна, 1997.—220 с.
Володимир Р. Нація на світанку.—Мюнхен: Українське видавництво, 1973.

Dramaturgy
Володимир Р. Сучасний вертеп: Драматичні твори.—Мюнхен: Українське видавництво, 1973.—171 с.

Publications
Володимир Р. Простір і воля. Нариси з мандрівок.—Лондон, 1972.—104 с.
«Записана книга»;

Scholarly works
«Віденська Січ» (1994), 
«До джерел драматургії Лесі Українки» (2000), 
«Буття в літературі» (2002).

References

1920 births
2007 deaths
Ukrainian poets
Ukrainian writers
20th-century poets
Soviet poets
Soviet writers